The YWCA Site is an archaeological site in North Kingstown, Rhode Island.

The site was added to the National Register of Historic Places in 1980.

See also
National Register of Historic Places listings in Washington County, Rhode Island

References

North Kingstown, Rhode Island
Archaeological sites on the National Register of Historic Places in Rhode Island
National Register of Historic Places in Washington County, Rhode Island